Ondine Achampong (born 10 February 2004) is a British artistic gymnast who was part of the women's team that won silver at the 2022 World Championships. She won a gold medal with the English team at the 2022 Commonwealth Games, and individually, Achampong won silver medals in the all-around and on floor exercise. She is the 2022 European team and balance beam silver medalist. She is the 2021 British all-around champion and the 2022 British all-around silver medalist.

As a junior, Achampong is the 2019 European Youth Olympic Festival champion on the balance beam and silver medallist in the all-around. She is also the 2019 British junior all-around champion. She won a bronze medal with the British team at the 2018 Junior European Championships.

Early life
Achampong was born in 2004. She has a Horsfield's tortoise named Mishelle.

Career

Espoir

2016–17 
In March 2016 Achampong competed at the British Team Championships where she placed eleventh in the all-around but recorded the third highest balance beam score and helped her team finish fifth.

In April 2017 she competed at the English Championships where she only competed on uneven bars, balance beam, and floor exercise and recorded the second highest scores on uneven bars and balance beam.  In December she competed at the British Espoir Championships where she placed first in the all-around, on balance beam, and on floor exercise, and placed second on uneven bars.

Junior

2018 
In February Achampong competed at the English Championships where she placed second behind Amelie Morgan. The following month she competed at the British Championships where she placed third in the all-around behind Morgan and Annie Young.  During event finals she placed third on uneven bars and floor exercise and sixth on balance beam.

In April Achampong competed at the 2018 City of Jesolo Trophy where she placed fifteenth in the all-around and helped Great Britain finish fourth in the team competition.  In July she competed at a friendly competition in Pieve di Soligo where she placed eleventh in the all-around but helped Great Britain win the bronze in the team competition.

In August Achampong represented Great Britain at the European Championships alongside Morgan, Young, Halle Hilton, and Phoebe Jakubczyk.  Together they won the bronze medal in the team competition behind Italy and Russia.  Individually Achampong finished tenth in the all-around.  Achampong ended the season at the Top Gym Tournament where she won gold on balance beam and placed fourth in the all-around and on floor exercise.

2019 
In February Achampong competed as a guest at the Welsh Championships where she placed first in the all-around and recorded the highest score on each apparatus.  In March she competed at the English Championships where she placed first in the all-around ahead of Halle Hilton and Jennifer Gadirova.  Later that month she competed at the British Championships where she placed first in the all-around and also won gold on uneven bars and balance beam and placed fourth on vault.

In July Achampong competed at the Sainté Gym Cup where she helped Great Britain win team gold and individually she placed first in the all-around.  Later that month she competed at the European Youth Summer Olympic Festival alongside Hilton and Young.  Together they won bronze in the team competition behind Russia and Romania.  Individually Achampong won silver in the all-around behind reigning junior world champion Viktoria Listunova of Russia.  During event finals she won gold on balance beam ahead of Silviana Sfiringu of Romania.

Senior

2020 
In 2020 Achampong became a senior. She made her senior debut at the Melbourne World Cup where she qualified to the balance beam and floor exercise finals.  During event finals she won silver on balance beam behind Urara Ashikawa of Japan and placed fourth on floor exercise behind American Jade Carey and Italians Vanessa Ferrari and Lara Mori.  She later competed at the Baku World Cup; during qualifications she once again qualified to the balance beam and floor exercise event finals.  However event finals were canceled due to the COVID-19 pandemic in Azerbaijan.

In June Achampong announced that she had verbally committed to the University of California, Berkeley to compete for their gymnastics program.

2021 
In April Achampong was named as an alternate for the European Championships. In May, Achampong competed at the Varna World Challenge Cup, where she qualified to the uneven bars, balance beam and floor exercise finals. During event finals, she placed third on balance beam behind Anastasiia Bachynska of Ukraine and Marine Boyer of France.

In November Achampong competed at the British Championships and won gold in the all-around, silver on uneven bars, and on balance beam, and bronze on floor exercise.

2022 

Achampong competed at the English and British Championships where she finished fourth and second in the all-around.  In June she was selected to represent England at the 2022 Commonwealth Games alongside Georgia-Mae Fenton, Claudia Fragapane, Alice Kinsella, and Kelly Simm. The group went on to win gold in the team competition while Achampong also took silver in the individual all-around.

Achampong was also selected to compete at the European Championships alongside Kinsella, Fenton, and Aylesbury teammates Jennifer and Jessica Gadirova.  In August Achampong competed at the European Championships.  She contributed scores on vault, uneven bars, and balance beam towards Great Britain's second place finish.  During event finals Achampong won silver on balance beam behind Emma Malewski of Germany.

In September Achampong was named to the team to compete at the 2022 World Championships, once again alongside the Gadirova twins, Kinsella, and Fenton.  She finished fifteenth in qualifications but did not advance to the all-around due to teammates Gadirova and Kinsella placing higher.  During the team final Achampong competed on vault and balance beam, helping Great Britain win the silver medal and achieve their highest placement at a World Championships.

Competitive history

References

2004 births
British female artistic gymnasts
Living people
Sportspeople from Hertfordshire
21st-century British women
Gymnasts at the 2022 Commonwealth Games
Commonwealth Games medallists in gymnastics
Commonwealth Games gold medallists for England
Commonwealth Games silver medallists for England
Medalists at the World Artistic Gymnastics Championships
Medallists at the 2022 Commonwealth Games